Yen Peyar Anandhan is a 2020 Tamil language suspense thriller film directed by Sridhar Venkatesan and starring Santhosh Prathap and Athulya Ravi in the lead roles. It was released on 27 November 2020.

Cast 
Santhosh Prathap as Sathya
Athulya Ravi as Savithri
Arun Asthma as Anandhan
Deepak Paramesh as Anwar
Aravind Rajagopal as Parthiban
Arun Ragav as Iyarkai
Teejay Karthi as Karthi
Divya as Charulatha
Madhan as the narrator

Production 
Sridhar Venkatesan had previously made the Sithiram Kolluthadi segment in the anthology film, 6 Athiyayam (2018). Santhosh Prathap and Deepak Paramesh were cast in the lead roles, while Athulya Ravi signed on to play the lead female role in early 2018.

In November 2020, the makers spoke out against Athulya for refusing to promote the film.

Release 
Before its theatrical release, the film was selected to be a part of the Sardar Vallabhbhai Patel International Film Festival.

The film was released on 27 November 2020. The Times of India gave the film two-and-a-half out of five stars, noting "even if we don't have to buy into the film's ideas, the earnestness with which it goes about its work kind of makes us look upon it a bit more favorably.". Maalaimalar gave the film a middling review concluding that its premise was unclear.

References

External links 
 

2020 films
2020s Tamil-language films
Indian thriller films
2020 thriller films